Javier Setó (1926–1969) was a Spanish screenwriter and film director.

Selected filmography
 Forbidden Trade (1952)
 Bronze and Moon (1953)
 Bread, Love and Andalusia (1958)
 Pelusa (1960)
 The Castilian (1963)
 The Sweet Sound of Death (1965)
 The Drums of Tabu (1966)
 Cry Chicago (1969)
 Viaje a vacio (1969) aka Shadow of Death

References

Bibliography 
 Bentley, Bernard. A Companion to Spanish Cinema. Boydell & Brewer 2008.

External links 
 

1926 births
1969 deaths
Spanish film directors
People from Lleida
20th-century Spanish screenwriters
20th-century Spanish male writers